Illuminations Candles is an American-based candle brand.

History 
Illuminations was founded by Wally Arnold, who launched the first retail store in 1996. In 2006, the brand was acquired by Yankee Candle. Faced with recession pressures, Yankee shuttered the Illuminations  stores, and in 2009, the final Illuminations candles were sold. In 2019, one of Illumination's former customers, Mitch Davis, acquired rights to the Illuminations trademark and liaised with product expert Pamela Donnellan to re-launch the brand with "Illuminations Candles, Inc." as its new registered name.

References

Candles
Manufacturing companies established in 1996
American brands